PSLV-C3 was the third operational launch and overall sixth mission of the PSLV program. This launch was also the forty-sixth launch by Indian Space Research Organisation since its first mission on 1 January 1962. The vehicle carried three satellites which were deployed in the Sun-synchronous Low Earth orbit. The vehicle carried Technology Experiment Satellite (Indian experimental earth observation satellite), BIRD (German earth observation satellite) and PROBA (experimental satellite from Belgium). This was India's and ISRO's second commercial spaceflight. PSLV-C3 was launched at 10:23 a.m. IST on 22 October 2001 from Satish Dhawan Space Centre  (then called "Sriharikota Range").

Mission highlights
The mission involved placing Technology Experiment Satellite (TES) and Bispectral and Infrared Remote Detection (BIRD) in a 568 km circular orbit. It would then place the PRoject for On Board Autonomy (PROBA) satellite in an 568 km x 638 km elliptical orbit. This demonstrated ISRO capability to launch multiple satellites in multiple orbits. It also earned ISRO $1 million for each satellite.

Mission parameters
 Mass:
 Total liftoff weight: 
 Payload weight: 
 Overall height: 
 Propellant:
 First stage: Solid HTPB based (138.0 + 54 tonnes)
 Second stage: Liquid UDMH +  (40 tonnes)
 Third stage: Solid HTPB based (7 tonnes)
 Fourth stage: Liquid MMH + MON (2.0 tonnes)
 Engine:
 First stage: S139
 Second stage: Vikas
 Third stage: 
 Fourth stage: 2 x PS-4
 Thrust:
 First stage: 4,430 + 677 x 6 kN
 Second stage: 724 kN
 Third stage: 324 kN
 Fourth stage: 7.4 x 2 kN
 Altitude: 
 Maximum velocity: (recorded at time of fourth stage ignition)
 Duration: 1,658 seconds

Payload
PSLV-C3 carried and deployed total three satellites. Technology Experiment Satellite (TES) was the main payload and BIRD and PROBA were two auxiliary payloads that were mounted on PSLV-C3. In the flight sequence, TES was injected first, followed by BIRD and then PROBA.

Launch & planned flight profile

PSLV-C3 was launched at 10:23 a.m. IST on 22 October 2001 from Satish Dhawan Space Centre  (then called "Sriharikota Launching Range"). The total flight time was 1658 seconds as PROBA was to be launched into an elliptical orbit after TES and BIRD were launched into a circular orbit. The orbit raise was done using the yaw RCS thrusters in off-modulated mode.

Following was the planned flight profile.

Fourth Stage Break-up event
The fourth stage of the PSLV had undergone a break-up event on 19 December 2001, likely caused by an explosion. After the explosion of PSLV-C3, ISRO carried out passivation of the upper stages of the PSLV, from the PSLV-C4 mission onwards. As per ISRO, this event generated 386 debris objects, of which 76 are still in orbit, as on 2021.

See also
 Indian Space Research Organisation
 Polar Satellite Launch Vehicle

References 

Spacecraft launched in 2001
Polar Satellite Launch Vehicle